Fresneau is a surname. Notable people with the surname include:

Armand Fresneau (1823–1900), French politician
François Fresneau de La Gataudière (1703–1770), French botanist and scientist
Jehan Fresneau  (fl.  1468–1505), French composer of the Renaissance

French-language surnames